Julie Houghton Keith is an American-Canadian writer, best known for her short-story collections The Jaguar Temple and The Devil Out There.

Background
She was born and brought up near Chicago, and was educated at Smith College in Northampton, Massachusetts. She received a B.A. from Smith College in 1962 and an M.A. from Concordia University in 1989. She is married to lawyer Dick Pound, a former vice-president of the International Olympic Committee.

Writing
Her first collection of short stories, The Jaguar Temple (Nuage Editions, 1995), was shortlisted for the Governor General's Award for English-language fiction at the 1995 Governor General's Awards. Her second collection, The Devil Out There (Knopf Canada, 1999), won the Quebec Writers' Federation's award for fiction in 2000.

Keith also won the Quebec Writers' Federation Community Award in 2006.

References

American women writers
American expatriate writers in Canada
Canadian women short story writers
Smith College alumni
Writers from Chicago
Writers from Montreal
Anglophone Quebec people
Living people
American emigrants to Canada
Naturalized citizens of Canada
20th-century Canadian women writers
21st-century Canadian women writers
20th-century Canadian short story writers
Concordia University alumni
20th-century American short story writers
21st-century American short story writers
Year of birth missing (living people)
20th-century American women writers
21st-century American women writers